This is a list of museums in the Province of Mantua, Lombardy Region, Italy.

Museums and ecomuseums 
Abbreviations: Sistema provinciale dei musei e dei beni culturali mantovani (SPMBCM)

References

External links 
 Cultural observatory of Lombardy Region

 
 
Province of Mantua
Mantua